Mollera Poovaiah Ganesh (born 8 July 1946) is a former Indian professional field hockey player and coach. He was also the captain and coach of the Indian team. He was awarded the Arjuna Award in 1973.

He was the head coach of the India hockey team at the 1990 Hockey World Cup.

Personal life
Ganesh was born on 8 July 1946 in the Kodagu (earlier known as Coorg) district in Karnataka. He switched over to hockey when he joined the Indian Army and played in the hockey tournaments from 1966 - 1973. Ganesh has completed MA in English, Diploma in Sports Coaching from the National Institute of Sports, Patiala and Ph.D in Physical education. Ganesh has 5 siblings (one sister and four brothers) of which 2 brothers, M P Subbaiah and M P Kaveriappa have achieved great laurels in both Football and Hockey at All India and national levels

Awards
 Arjuna Award - 1973
 Silver Jubilee Sports Award of Karnataka - 1981
 Padma Shri award - 2020

References

External links
 

1946 births
Indian male field hockey players
Recipients of the Arjuna Award
Indian field hockey coaches
Kodava people
Living people
People from Kodagu district
Field hockey players from Karnataka
Olympic field hockey players of India
Field hockey players at the 1972 Summer Olympics
Olympic medalists in field hockey
Asian Games medalists in field hockey
Field hockey players at the 1970 Asian Games
Field hockey players at the 1974 Asian Games
Medalists at the 1972 Summer Olympics
Asian Games silver medalists for India
Olympic bronze medalists for India
Medalists at the 1970 Asian Games
Medalists at the 1974 Asian Games
Recipients of the Padma Shri in sports